Jovica Blagojević (born 27 August 1998) is a Serbian footballer, playing in Montenegro for FK Radnički Obrenovac.

Career

Youth
During the 2013, as a member of FK Jagodina Blagojević was called to Serbia U16 national team selection, and played some friendly matches. He stayed with Jagodina until 2014. Later, from 2014 to 2015, he was with cadet team of FK Rad and Serbia U17. In 2015, Blagojević joined youth team of FK Voždovac.

Voždovac
Blagojević made his debut for the first team in the 20th fixture of 2015–16 season, played on 5 December 2015, against Radnički Niš and became the youngest player of FK Voždovac who made appearance in the Serbian SuperLiga. Ending of 2015, Blagojević signed his first professional contract with FK Voždovac, until 2019.

On 25 January 2019, Blagojević was loaned out to FK Sinđelić Beograd for the rest of the season.

Return to Radnički Obrenovac
In January 2020, Blagojević returned to FK Radnički Obrenovac, the club he played for on loan in 2018.

Career statistics

References

External links
 Jovica Blagojević stats at utakmica.rs
 

1998 births
Living people
Sportspeople from Kragujevac
Association football defenders
Serbian footballers
Serbian expatriate footballers
FK Jagodina players
FK Rad players
FK Voždovac players
FK Radnički Obrenovac players
FK Sinđelić Beograd players
FK Kom players
Serbian SuperLiga players
Serbian First League players
Montenegrin First League players
Serbian expatriate sportspeople in Montenegro
Expatriate footballers in Montenegro